The following is a list of parks in St. Petersburg, Florida, United States.

Abercrombie Park
Albert Whitted Park
Allendale Park
Arrowhead Park
Auburn Street Park
Azalea Park
Bartlett Park
Baywood Park Indian
Bayou Highlands
Bay Vista Park
Bear Creek Park
Blanc Park
Booker Creeker
Booker Creek Park
Boyd Hill Nature Preserve
Broadwater Park
Campell Park
Central Oak Park
Childs Park Linear
Childs Park
Clam Bayou Nature Preserve
Coconut Park
Coffee Pot Riviera
Cook Park
Coquina Key Park
Crescent Lake Park
Crisp Park
Dell Holmes Park
Demens Landing Park
Denver Park
Disston Lake Park
Downtown Waterfront Park
Dwight Jones Park
Eaglecrest Lake Park
Edgemoor Park
Elva Rouse Park
Enoch Davis Park
Euclid Lake Park
Flora Wylie Park
Forrest Bluff Park
Fossil Park
Fountain of Youth
Franklin Heights Park
George Hedke Park
Gizella Kopsick Palm Arboretum
Gladden Park
Golf Creek Park
Granada Terrace Park
Grandview Park
Harbordale Park
Harding Park
Harshaw Lake
Historic Round Lake Park
Indian Mound Park
International Park
Jack Puryear Park
Jamestown Park
Jorgensen Lake Park
Jungle Prada De Narvaez Park
Katherine B. Tippetts Park
Kelly Lake Park
Kenwood Dog Park
Lake Maggiore Park
Lake Pasadena Park
Lake Vista Park
Lakewood Terrace Neighborhood Park
Lassing Park
Leslee Lake Park
Linear Park
Little bayou Park
Louise Lake Park
Lynch Lake Park
Mastry Lake Park
Maximo Park
Meadowlawn Park
Millennium Youth Park
Mirror Lake Park
North Central Neighborhood Park
North Shore Park
North Straub Park
Northeast Exchange Club Coffee Pot Park
Northeast Mini Park
Northwest Park
Palmetto Park
Park on Park
Pasadena Circle
Pasadena Triangle Park
Perry Bayview Community Playground
Pier Park
Pinellas Point Park
Pioneer Park
Playlot 1
Playlot 2
Playlot 3
Pocket Park
Poynter Park
Queen Dennis Park
Rio Vista Park
Riviera Bay Park
Roberts Park
Roser Park
Royal "Roy" Eden, Jr. Park
Seminole Park
Sheffield Lake Park
Shore Acres Mini Park
Shore Acres Park
Silver Lake Playlot
Sirmons Lake Park
Snell Isle Park
South Shore Park
South Staub Park
Spa Beach Park
Sunhaven Lake Park
Sunset Park
Switch Park
Sylvia C. Boring Park
Taylor Park
Trailhead Park
Treasure Island Beach
Tyrone Park
Unity Park
Unnamed Lake
Vinoy Park
Walter Fuller Park
Westminster Community Playground
Wildwood Park
Williams Park
Wood Park
Woodlawn Park

References

External links 
St. Petersburg Parks and Recreation website

Parks
Urban public parks
Parks in Pinellas County, Florida
St. Petersburg